Elmer Stephen Clark (February 26, 1891 – June 29, 1954) was an American actor. He is best known for playing sheriff roles in movies and television. Prior to 1933 he had been a stage actor, director and manager since 1909.

Clark was born February 1891 in Daviess County, Indiana. He married Ruth Clark and later to Emily Margaret Clark and Ruth. Clark died June 1954 in Van Nuys, Los Angeles, California. He was buried in 	
Valhalla Memorial Park, Los Angeles County, California.

Filmography

Film

Television

References

External links 

Rotten Tomatoes profile

1891 births
1954 deaths
20th-century American male actors
American male film actors
American male television actors
Male actors from Indiana
Male Western (genre) film actors